The following properties are listed on the National Register of Historic Places in Tom Green County, Texas.

This is intended to be a complete list of properties and districts listed on the National Register of Historic Places in Tom Green County, Texas. The county hosts two districts, one of which is a National Historic Landmark (NHL), and 66 individually listed properties. The NHL district is also a State Antiquities Landmark and contains numerous Recorded Texas Historic Landmarks (RTHL). Six additional National Register properties are also RTHLs. An additional property has been removed from the National Register.

Current listings

The locations of National Register properties and districts may be seen in a mapping service provided.

|}

Former listings

|}

See also

National Register of Historic Places listings in Texas
Recorded Texas Historic Landmarks in Tom Green County

References

External links

Registered Historic Places
Tom Green County
Buildings and structures in Tom Green County, Texas